The Type 41 75 mm mountain gun is a Japanese license-built copy of the recoiling Krupp M1908 mountain gun. The Type 41  number was designated for the year the gun was accepted, the  41st year of Emperor Meiji's reign, 1908 in the Gregorian calendar after the conclusion of the Russo-Japanese War. Originally it was the standard pack artillery weapon. After it was superseded by the Type 94 75 mm mountain gun, it was then used as an infantry "regimental" gun, deployed four to each infantry regiment, and referred to as "rentai ho" (regimental artillery). Two gun shields were produced for the weapon, an early type, which folded into thirds, and a late type, which folded in half.

It can be disassembled and carried by horse, or manpacked (manually carried), making it convenient for use in mountainous regions and areas with many obstacles.

Service
In Japanese service the gun was crewed by thirteen men, twelve gunners and a squad leader. When the weapon was being fired there would be one aimer, one loader, one firer, one person to swing the guns aim left or right, a man inserting the fuzes into rounds and handing them to the loader, two gunners lying in reserve to the left and right of the gun position, and the squad leader sitting a little distance to the rear of the weapon. The remaining five men would ferry ammunition in relays from the ammunition squad, which would typically be in cover a few hundred meters behind the gun's position.

The weapon could be transported complete by its thirteen-man squad, or broken down into parts and carried on six pack horses using special harnesses, a seventh horse was used to carry ammunition.

Two types of impact fuze were available for the Type 97, a 75 mm high explosive round, one with a delay of 0.05 seconds, the second with a delay of 1 second. U.S. Army testing of the weapon at a range of  resulted in 75 percent of the rounds falling in a rectangle . At maximum range (7,100 m or 7,800 yards) 75 percent of the rounds fell within a rectangle 10 yards wide and 200 yards long (9 m wide and 180 m long).

Ammunition
 Type 98 high-explosive – 
 Type 97 high-explosive – 
 Type 94 high-explosive – 
 Type 90 high-explosive – 
 Type 95 armor-piercing high-explosive – can penetrate 20 mm of steel plate at 3,000 m – 
 Type 1 armor-piercing – 
 Type 38 shrapnel – 
 Type 90 shrapnel – 282 10.5 gram lead balls and 0.1 kg black powder bursting charge – 
 Type 2 hollow charge – can penetrate 102 mm of RHA - 
 Incendiary
 Type 90 smoke (white phosphorus) – 
 Type 90 incendiary – 
 Liquid incendiary projectile – 
 Type 90 illuminating – 
 Vomit gas projectile –

References

Notes

Bibliography
 http://www3.plala.or.jp/takihome/41-75.htm
 US Technical Manual E 30-480
 Japanese Infantry Arms In World War II, Ritta Nakanishi, 
 
 

World War I artillery of Japan
4
Mountain artillery
75 mm artillery